Lewis Morgan (died 3 July 1635) was a Welsh politician who sat in the House of Commons  from 1628 to 1629.

Morgan was the son of Sir Thomas Morgan, of Ruperra. In 1628, he was elected Member of Parliament for Cardiff and sat until 1629 when King Charles decided to rule without parliament for eleven years. He was knighted at Whitehall on 25 March 1629. 
 
Morgan died in his father's lifetime at Hampstead in 1635.

Morgan married  Ann Morgan, daughter of General Sir Charles Morgan, of Delft.

References

Year of birth missing
1635 deaths
Members of the Parliament of England (pre-1707) for constituencies in Wales
17th-century Welsh politicians
English MPs 1628–1629